Forest Town, as the name implies, is a leafy suburb of Johannesburg, South Africa. It lies between the busy thoroughfares of Jan Smuts Avenue and Oxford Road, and is bordered to one side by the Johannesburg Zoo.

History
The suburb was first surveyed on land called Sachsenwald, now known as Saxonwold, in 1908. The name of the suburb is derived from the Sachsenwald plantation.

Forest Town is well known as the scene of a high profile police raid, the Forest Town raid, on a gay party in 1966, which triggered a moral panic and led to the Apartheid government passing the Immorality Amendment Bill of 1967. The Bill criminalised all sexual activity between men, as well as extending the legislation to include lesbians. Following South Africa's first non-racial elections in 1994, all discriminatory legislation was repealed.

In 2005, the Forest Town home of Jacob Zuma, at that time deputy president of South Africa, was raided by the Scorpions in order to obtain documents for his corruption trial. Jacob Zuma, now a former president of South Africa, is currently under investigation for fraud, money laundering, racketeering, and a host of other criminal charges.

References

External links
https://web.archive.org/web/20060614103125/http://www.wits.ac.za/gala/archives_i.htm Gay and Lesbian Archives of South Africa

Johannesburg Region B